Hermippus cruciatus, is a species of spider of the genus Hermippus. It is native to India and Sri Lanka.

See also
 List of Zodariidae species

References

Zodariidae
Spiders of the Indian subcontinent
Spiders of Asia
Spiders described in 1905